Juniville is a commune in the Ardennes department and Grand Est region of north-eastern France.

Population

Personalities
 The poet Paul Verlaine rented a room in Juniville in the 1880s, close to the farm where his pupil Lucien Létinois lived. The village inn has been restored and turned into a museum dedicated to Verlaine.

See also
Communes of the Ardennes department

References

External links

  Official site

Communes of Ardennes (department)
Ardennes communes articles needing translation from French Wikipedia